Jonas Samuelsson (born 10 April 1991) is a Swedish handball player for IFK Skövde and the Swedish national team.

He made international debut on the Swedish national team in April 2019.

References

1991 births
Living people
People from Skövde Municipality
Swedish male handball players
Aalborg Håndbold players
Sportspeople from Västra Götaland County